Walter De Vecchi (born 18 February 1955 in Milan, Italy) is an Italian professional football coach and a former player who played as a defender or midfielder. He is currently managing one of the youth teams of A.C. Milan.

Career
De Vecchi began with his hometown club A.C. Milan, but would play for Varese and Monza- most notably playing a key role in the latter club's bid to win promotion to Serie A. Returning to Milan for the 1978–79 season, he would be a regular player in a side that won the Serie A championship before moving to Ascoli Calcio 1898 in 1981.

He forged a midfield partnership at Ascoli with Giuseppe Greco, and the two finished joint top scorers in the 1982–83 season with 7 goals each. He later played for Napoli, Bologna and Reggiana, retiring in 1992.

External links
 Career Stats

Italian footballers
1955 births
Living people
Serie A players
Serie B players
A.C. Milan players
S.S.D. Varese Calcio players
A.C. Monza players
Ascoli Calcio 1898 F.C. players
S.S.C. Napoli players
Bologna F.C. 1909 players
A.C. Reggiana 1919 players
A.C. Carpi managers
Italian football managers
Venezia F.C. managers
Cosenza Calcio managers
Como 1907 managers
A.C. Cesena managers
S.P.A.L. managers
A.C. Milan non-playing staff
Association football midfielders
Association football defenders